Tom or Thomas Moloney may refer to:
Tom Moloney (businessman), British businessman
Tom Moloney (rugby union) (born 1994), Australian rugby union player
Thomas W. Moloney of Chaffee-Moloney Houses

See also
Thomas Maloney (disambiguation)